China National Highway 566 runs from Xiji in Ningxia to Tianshui in Gansu. At Xiji, it connects to G309 and at Tianshui to G310. Most of the route consists of upgraded sections of Ningxia provincial highway S202 and Gansu provincial highways S305 and S218. It is one of the new trunk highways proposed in the China National Highway Network Planning (2013 - 2030).

Route table

See also
 China National Highways

References

 
 

Transport in Gansu